Northside Tower is a nine-story, mid-rise office building located at 6065 Roswell Road in downtown Sandy Springs, Georgia, a northern suburb of Atlanta. The building offers  of office space, as well as street-level commercial vendors, including a restaurant. Construction of the building was completed in 1971, and the architectural design is in the form of early-seventies modern. The building is technically considered part of the Perimeter Center office sub-market. The significance of Northside Tower comes from the purpose it has served as an unofficial landmark for the center of Sandy Springs, even before the city's incorporation in 2005.

References

External links
Emporis Listing

Buildings and structures in Fulton County, Georgia
Sandy Springs, Georgia